Otis Anderson may refer to:

Otis Anderson Jr. (1998–2021), American college football running back
Ottis Anderson (born 1957), American football running back